Sir Ramasamy Chetty Kandasamy Shanmukham Chetty KCIE (17 October 1892 – 5 May 1953) was an Indian lawyer, economist and politician who served as first Finance Minister of India from 1947 to 1948. He also served as President of India's Central Legislative Assembly from 1933 to 1935 and Diwan of Cochin kingdom from 1935 to 1941.

Shanmukham Chetty was born in Coimbatore in 1892 and studied at Madras Christian College and Madras Law College. On completion of his education, Shanmukham Chetty joined politics and served both in the Indian nationalist Swaraj Party as well as the Justice Party. Shanmukham Chetty was elected to the Central Legislative Assembly of India and served as its Deputy President from 1931 to 1935. After losing the 1935 elections, Chetty returned to South India where he served as Diwan of Cochin kingdom from 1935 to 1941. On India's independence in 1947, Jawaharlal Nehru, the first Prime Minister of India controversially chose Chetty as his Finance Minister despite the latter's well known pro-British leanings. Shanmukham Chetty died on 5 May 1953.

During his public life, Chetty also identified with a number of social causes. He was a strong supporter of the Tamil Isai Movement. Shanmukham Chetty was the Finance Minister of India when the country's first budget was tabled in Parliament on 26 November 1947.

Early life 

Shanmukham Chetty was born to Kandasamy Chetty in Vaaniar Street, Coimbatore on 17 October 1892. Shanmukham Chetty's grandfather Ramasami Chetty had migrated to Coimbatore in the middle of the 19th century. The family was involved in business and owned a number of mills in Coimbatore city.

Shanmukham Chetty had his schooling at Coimbatore. He studied economics at Madras Christian College and graduated in law from Madras Law College. On completion of his graduation, Shanmukham Chetty did not join the bar. Instead, he took care of the family business and after some time, entered politics.

Early political career 

Shanmukham Chetty joined the Justice Party and became a Councillor in the Coimbatore municipality in 1917. Soon afterwards, he was elected Vice-Chairman of the Coimbatore Municipality. Chetty is credited with having brought about some reforms in the municipal administration.
 
In 1920, Shanmukham Chetty participated in the Madras Presidency legislative council elections and was elected to the Madras Legislative Council. He served as a member of the Madras Legislative Council from 1920 to 1922, when he resigned. He joined the Swaraj Party and was, in 1924, elected to the Central Legislative Assembly, the newly inaugurated lower house of the Imperial Legislative Council of India. Chetty represented Indian employers at the International Labour Conference in Geneva in 1928, 1929 and 1932. He was the Indian delegate at the Imperial Economic Conference held at Ottawa in 1932.

In 1932, Shanmukhan Chetty was made Deputy-President of the Central Legislative Assembly and in 1934, made President, in succession to Sir Ibrahim Rahimtoola. Shanmukham Chetty served as President till 1935, when he had to quit his membership of the Central legislative Assembly after losing the 1935 elections.

During his tenure as member of the Central Legislative Assembly, Chetty is believed to have enjoyed the support of Lord Willingdom, who once even referred to Shanmugham Chetty as his "god-son".

Later political career 

Chetty served as Diwan of Cochin from 1935 to 1941. During his tenure, new reforms were brought in the administration of the princely state. Chetty introduced schemes for the improvement of Cochin port. He also tried to do away with Hindu religious superstitions and introduce Periyar's schemes. Chetty returned to Madras in 1941 and was succeeded by E. F. W. Dickinson.

In 1938, Chetty visited Geneva as the Indian delegate to the League of Nations. He was also India's delegate to the World Monetary Conference at Bretton Woods in 1944. During this period, Shanmukham Chetty tried to revive the staggering Justice Party but failed. For a short period, he served as constitutional advisor to the Nawab of Bhopal. He also served as President of the Indian Tariff Board. Due to his pro-British views, Shanmukham Chetty was not included in the Constituent Assembly.

When India got independence on 15 August 1947, he is reported to have said

Due to his expertise in economics, Shanmukham Chetty was chosen by the Father of the Nation, Mahathma Gandhi, against the wishes of Jawaharlal Nehru, to be the Finance Minister in independent India's first cabinet. However, due to conflict of views with Nehru, Chetty quit after a short time. Shanmukham Chetty is, today, remembered for presenting the first budget of independent India on 26 November 1947.

Chetty returned to state politics and was re-elected to the Madras State Legislative Assembly in the 1952 elections as an independent candidate.

Constituent Assembly Debates 
In the Constituent Assembly, Chetty he intervened on the issues of fiscal federalism.  

The Parliament House will join with me in conveying our condolence to his family. The House may stand in silence for a minute and express its sorrow.

Death 

Shanmukham Chetty suffered a severe heart attack on 3 May 1953. He succumbed to a second attack on the evening of 5 May 1953.

Honours 

Chetty was made a Knight Commander of the Order of the Indian Empire on 3 June 1933. He was conferred with the degree of Doctor of Philosophy by the Annamalai University. 
A life-size bronze statue of Dr. Chetty was unveiled on the campus of R. K. Sreerangammal Kalvi Nilayam Higher Secondary School, Coimbatore on 6 July 2014.

Notes

References

Further reading 
Business Legends by Gita Piramal (1998) – Published by Viking Penguin India.
T. Praskasam by P. Rajeswara Rao under National Biography Series published by the National Book Trust, India (1972).

1892 births
1953 deaths
First Nehru ministry
Businesspeople from Tamil Nadu
Tamil Nadu politicians
Union Ministers from Tamil Nadu
Bretton Woods Conference delegates
Presidents of the Central Legislative Assembly of India
Madras Christian College alumni
Members of the Central Legislative Assembly of India
Knights Commander of the Order of the Indian Empire
Indian knights
People from Coimbatore
Diwans of Cochin
Finance Ministers of India
Ministers_for_Corporate_Affairs